|}

This is a list of electoral district results of the 1933 Western Australian election.

Results by Electoral district

Albany 

 Preferences were not distributed.

Avon

Beverley

Boulder

Brown Hill-Ivanhoe

Bunbury

Canning

Claremont

Collie

East Perth 

 Preferences were not distributed.

Forrest

Fremantle

Gascoyne

Geraldton

Greenough

Guildford-Midland

Hannans

Irwin-Moore 

 Preferences were not distributed.

Kalgoorlie 

 Preferences were not distributed.

Kanowna

Katanning 

|- style="background-color:#E9E9E9"
! colspan="6" style="text-align:left;" |After distribution of preferences

 Preferences were not distributed to completion.

Kimberley

Leederville 

 Preferences were not distributed.

Maylands

Middle Swan 

 Preferences were not distributed.

Mount Hawthorn

Mount Magnet

Mount Marshall

Murchison

Murray-Wellington

Nedlands

Nelson

North Perth

North-East Fremantle

Northam 

 Preferences were not distributed.

Perth

Pilbara

Pingelly

Roebourne

South Fremantle 

 Preferences were not distributed.

Subiaco

Sussex

Swan 

 Richard Sampson was the sitting member for Swan that changed from the Nationalist to the Country party for this election.

Toodyay

Victoria Park 

 Preferences were not distributed.

Wagin

West Perth

Williams-Narrogin

Yilgarn-Coolgardie

York 

 Preferences were not distributed.

See also 

 1933 Western Australian state election
 Members of the Western Australian Legislative Assembly, 1933–1936

References 

Results of Western Australian elections
1933 elections in Australia